Alternate spellings include Wolfe, Wolff, Wulf and Wolf.

Woolf is a name that is used as a surname, given name, and a name among Germanic-speaking peoples: see Wolf, Wulf.
This name is particularly popular in England especially in the south due to strong Saxon influence: see Anglo-Saxon settlement of Britain. Historians on Anglo Saxon Britain such as Barbara Yorke, have commented that the Woolf name originated from Oswelf the 'Wolf', who was a famous Saxon lord who in legend fought King Horsa. He supposedly changed his name to 'Woolf' from the more Germanic spelling of Wolf. This is the first recording of the Woolf name, although according to Yorke it is most likely that other Saxon families changed their name to this translation.

Notable people with the name include:
Aida Woolf (1886–1967) was a British dress designer 
Arthur Woolf (1766–1837), English engineer, best known for invention of a compound steam engine
Benjamin Edward Woolf (1836–1901), British-American playwright, composer and journalist
Cecil Woolf (1927–2019), English author and publisher
Daniel Woolf (b. 1958), principal of Queen's University in Kingston, Ontario
Edgar Allan Woolf (1881–1943), American playwright and co-author of the script for The Wizard of Oz (1939 film)
Dame Fiona Woolf (b. 1948), Lord Mayor of London
George Woolf (1910–1946), Canadian horse-racing jockey
Harry Woolf (1923–2003), American historian of science, provost of Johns Hopkins University and Director of the Institute for Advanced Study
Harry Woolf, Baron Woolf, Lord Chief Justice of England and Wales
Herbert M. Woolf (1880–1964), American businessman and racehorse owner
Jack Woolf (1924–2014), American academic
Jimmy Woolf (1916–2003), South African footballer who played for Southampton F.C.
Leonard Woolf (1880–1969), author and husband of Virginia 
Meg Woolf (born 1923), English artist
Peter Wolff, English musician, drummer in the band The Echoes
Raphael Woolf, British philosopher
Russell Woolf, Western Australian media personality
Virginia Woolf (1882–1941), English author and feminist

References 

English-language surnames
Surnames from given names